The Bird Spring Formation is a geologic formation in Nevada. It preserves fossils dating back to the Carboniferous and Permian periods.

See also

 List of fossiliferous stratigraphic units in Nevada
 Paleontology in Nevada

References
 

Geologic formations of Nevada
Permian System of North America
Carboniferous southern paleotropical deposits